Phebalium obovatum is a species of spreading shrub that is endemic to Western Australia. It has thick, egg-shaped or elliptical leaves densely covered with silvery scales on the lower side and white flowers arranged in umbels with silvery or rust-coloured scales on the back.

Description
The leaves are glossy on the upper surface, covered with silvery scales on the lower surface. Flowering occurs from September to December.

Taxonomy
This species was first formally described in 1970 by Paul Wilson in the journal Nuytsia, and was given the name Phebalium lepidotum var. obovatum. In 1998, following "field studies over the past thirty years", Wilson raised the variety to species status as Phebelium obovatum.

Distribution and habitat
Phebalium obovatum grows in heath or mallee woodland in the Ravensthorpe district.

Conservation status
This phebalium is classified as "not threatened" by the Government of Western Australia Department of Parks and Wildlife.

References

obovatum
Flora of Western Australia
Plants described in 1970
Taxa named by Paul G. Wilson